Bashira is a 2021 American horror film directed by Nickson Fong based on a Japanese legend. It was selected to festivals Cine-Excess, TerrorMolins, Shocker Fest International Film Festival, Buenos Aires Rojo Sangre, among others.

Synopsis
After suffering a series of nightmares with bizarre and mysterious appearances, Andy (Liam Aiken), an electronic musician, and Lela (Mitzi Akaha), an aspiring singer, end up embarking on parallel journeys in search of answers.

Cast
 Liam Aiken - Andy Monrovia
 Mitzi Akaha - Lela Cavanaugh
 Kiki Sukezane - Maya Shitara
 Emma Caymares - Aliss Lopez
 Brandon Gill - Chris Marshall
 Akiko Shima - Yone Kume
 Eddy Toru Ohno - Kazuo Kariya
 Colin Cunningham - John Cavanaugh
 Sayuri Oyamada - Yoko Cavanaugh
 Akiko Fujiwara - Young Yoko Cavanaugh
 Toru Uchikado - Michihisa Kariya
 Takuma Anzai - Kenji Okazaki
 Sono Hideko - Setsuko Shitara
 Josie DiVincenzo - Sharon Monrovia
 Alana de Freitas - Dani Cavanaugh
 Nick Sakai - Limousine Driver

Production
In early 2014, Nickson Fong and Eko Nonoyama began developing the screenplay, with Eko's original japanese screenplay being completed in 2017. Later in 2017, Los Angeles filmmaker Todd Ocvirk created an adapted version of the screenplay in english. On the 2018 production set, producer Steve Krone said, "It's not a gory of violent horror film. I would describe it as more of a sort of supernatural kind of ghost story kind of horror film."

Principal photography began in Buffalo, New York in July 2018, and was initially scheduled to be released in 2019, which it did not. Some of the locations include WNED-TV studio, Statler City, Aurora, Little Rock City and Shinshiro, Japan.

Soundtrack
On November 6, 2021, the main theme song for Bashira was released on their official YouTube channel. The track titled "Can You Hear Me?" a music by Fumitake Igarashi & David Sisko performed by Katharine L. Feeley and Mark Matters.
"Can You Hear Me?" (Katharine L. Feeley and Mark Matters)
"Ocean of Embers" (featuring Mod Sun)
 "Bashira Cursed Song" (Punk Metak Version) (feat. Septimo Cain)

Awards
 2021 TerrorMolins
Videodrome
 Best Original Soundtrack (Can Your Hear Me?)
 2021 Bleedingham Horror Film Festival
Best Picture

References

External links
 
 Official YouTube

2021 horror films
2021 independent films
2020s English-language films
American independent films
Films based on Japanese myths and legends
Films shot in Buffalo, New York
Films shot in Japan
2020s Japanese-language films
2021 directorial debut films
2021 multilingual films
American multilingual films
2020s American films